Donald Pippin (November 25, 1926 – June 9, 2022) was a Tony and Emmy Award-winning American theatre musical director and orchestral conductor.

References

External links

 

1926 births
2022 deaths
Musicians from Macon, Georgia
American male conductors (music)
20th-century American conductors (music)
21st-century American conductors (music)
20th-century American male musicians
21st-century American male musicians
Members of The Lambs Club